Christos Valavanidis (born 21 May 1944) is a Greek actor. He appeared in more than sixty films since 1979.

Selected filmography

References

External links 

1944 births
Living people
Greek male film actors
Male actors from Athens